Sir Peter Gleane, 1st Baronet (c. 1619 - 7 February 1696) was a member of the East Anglian gentry and Member of the Parliament of England.

Life
He was baptised in 1619, the eldest son of Thomas Gleane (died 1661) and Elizabeth Brewse. His father was descended from major merchants in Norwich during the Tudor era - Thomas' grandfather had bought Hardwick in Norfolk as his family seat and his father Peter had sat for Norwich between 1628 and 1629.

Thomas remained neutral in the Civil War, but Peter raised two foot companies for the Royalists at his own expense during the English Civil War and served in the regiment of Sir Thomas Bridges of Somerset - he is recorded as a Lieutenant of Foot around 1643, possibly rising to Captain by 1645. During the Protectorate he continued to be suspected of Royalist sympathies and around 1650 he married Penelope Rodney (died 1690), daughter of Sir Edward Rodney of Rodney Stoke - the couple had two sons and one daughter. On the English Restoration in 1660 he became a major in the militia and a lieutenant in the volunteer horse, whilst the following year he succeeded his father and the following year he became a commissioner for "loyal and indigent officers".

A baronetcy was created for him on 6 March 1666 during the 2nd Anglo-Dutch War, in which he served as Lieutenant Colonel of Lord Townshend's Regiment of Foot. He was Townshend's second in command and led the defence of Great Yarmouth. He became a commissioner for recusants in 1675 but he and Townshend were both removed from local office in 1676. During the Exclusion Crisis he actively favoured barring James, Duke of York from the succession for his Roman Catholicism. He then stood with Sir John Hobart for Norfolk in autumn 1679, gaining dissenters' support and beating the two pro-Charles II candidates. In his victory speech to the freeholders Gleane promised that: 

He was appointed to five committees during the Second Exclusion Parliament and was re-elected in 1681. This second election finally broke his finances, however, and in 1682 he erected his own tomb in the chancel of the church at Hardwick, though he was never buried in it. It is inscribed:

In 1686 pressure was put on him to pay the £1095 fee for his baronetcy, but Laurence Hyde, 1st Lord of the Treasury quashed this. Matters were so dire just before his death that he had to sell Hardwick to Sir John Holland and his eldest son had to live off a £20 a year pension from the county rates until even that was withdrawn and he was thrown into the Fleet Prison.

He died in 1694 and was buried at Hardwick. He was succeeded in the baronetcy by his eldest son, Thomas.

References

English justices of the peace
Baronets in the Baronetage of England
1696 deaths
English MPs 1679
English MPs 1681
Cavaliers
Military personnel of the Anglo-Dutch Wars
Year of birth uncertain
Members of the Parliament of England for Norfolk
People from Shelton and Hardwick